Handley Welbourn Brown (29 August 1904 – 5 December 1973) was a New Zealand rugby union player. A centre three-quarter, Brown represented Taranaki at a provincial level, and was a member of the New Zealand national side, the All Blacks, from 1924 to 1926. He played 20 matches for the All Blacks, scoring 35 points, but did not appear in any internationals.

Handley Brown played 49 games for Taranaki between 1923 and 1930.

His son Ross Brown, nicknamed Pascoe, played 144 matches for Taranaki from 1953 to 1968 and 25 matches for the All Blacks from 1955 to 1962.

References

1904 births
1973 deaths
People from Inglewood, New Zealand
People educated at New Plymouth Boys' High School
New Zealand rugby union players
New Zealand international rugby union players
Taranaki rugby union players
Rugby union centres
Rugby union players from Taranaki